Phantasialand is a theme park in Brühl, North Rhine-Westphalia, Germany that attracts approximately 2 million visitors annually. The park was opened in 1967 by Gottlieb Löffelhardt and Richard Schmidt. Although starting as a family-oriented park, Phantasialand has also added thrill rides, especially during recent years. Furthermore, following the example of Europa-Park, they have decided to attract business customers beside the regular ones, calling it "Business to Pleasure".

Phantasialand is known for its high attention to detail in its theming and introduces new attractions more often compared to other theme parks to compensate for its small area and regularly is voted one of the best parks in the world.

Among the park's thrill rides is Taron (the world's second fastest multi-launch coaster), Black Mamba (a Bolliger & Mabillard inverted coaster) and a themed Mine Train roller coaster called Colorado Adventure, which runs among some mountains in the park's Wild West section and was opened by Michael Jackson. The last addition was F.L.Y. which is a Vekoma launched flying coaster.

History
Phantasialand opened in 1967.

On 1 May 2001, a fire destroyed two roller coasters, a theatre and parts of the Westernstadt. It was the result of a cable fire in the Grand-Canyon-Bahn caused by faulty wiring. The blaze covered about 38 million Deutsche Mark (US$17 million) in damage and 54 people were injured. Phantasialand reopened the park about two weeks later and invested about €2 million in fire safety, equipping every building with sprinkler systems.

Phantasialand is also home to "Mystery Castle", an indoor Intamin Ride Trade Bungee Drop featuring a walk through a haunted castle. Next to the castle is "River Quest", a rapid river ride which features a lift, built by Hafema in 2002. It replaced the attractions destroyed by the fire one year before.

In 2002, Winja's Fear and Force, two indoor spinning coasters built by Maurer Söhne, were built along with a new area called Wuze Town.

New for 2006 was an African-themed B&M inverted roller coaster called Black Mamba.

A four-star on-site hotel called Hotel Ling Bao, which is Chinese themed, opened in 2004.  The hotel's roof tiles were imported from China, and every room door was hand-engraved.  The hotel has two restaurants; one of them - the LU CHI - is renowned for its Euro-Asiatic cuisine, a bar, a pool with sauna, garden area, spa and its own entrance to the park. A second (three-star) hotel called "Matamba" opened in August 2008 in the Deep in Africa section.

Phantasialand opened another ride for 2007 called Talocan, a Suspended Top Spin by Huss Maschinenfabrik. It is located in the Mexican section of the park.
In 2008 a splash battle ride, Wakobato, opened in the lake in the old fairytale forest. The attraction is highly debated amongst residents living next to the park, who complain about noise pollution.

In 2010 Phantasialand opened five new attractions for children in Wuze Town: Baumberger Irrgarten (Maze), Die fröhliche Bienchenjagd (Jump Around by Zamperla), Wolke's Luftpost (Magic Bikes by Zamperla), Der lustige Papagei (Crazy Bus by Zamperla), and Würmling Express (Monorail). The Berlin part of the park has also been reworked, with many Berlin-themed houses, fountains and a tribune for shows. Also new in 2010 was the show 'Sieben' (seven) by Jan Rouven.

In 2011 Phantasialand opened two new attractions: Maus au Chocolat, an ETF dark ride in Alt Berlin and a chair-swing on the Kaisersplatz. 
The old shop in Berlin was replaced with a funhouse-style attraction called "Verrücktes Hotel Tartüff", built by the park's engineers and opened in 2012.

For the 2013 season, Phantasialand built a new log flume-style attraction to replace their two previous water attractions. It is embedded in a large area of canyons and mountains, as a miniature model on display in the park had already revealed during construction. Chiapas: DIE Wasserbahn opened on 1 April 2014.

After the winter season 201314, Silver City (a western theme town) and the dark ride Silbermine were removed to allow construction on the park's 2016 launched roller coaster, Taron, and the new themed area Klugheim, which was to become a part of the Mystery area. Another roller coaster, Raik, is located in the Klugheim area, and is more family-oriented than the likes of Taron. The coaster is a Vekoma family boomerang model attraction.

Also in 2016, Race for Atlantis was removed to make way for a new themed area called Rookburgh with a rollercoaster named F.L.Y., the world's first launched flying roller coaster and the longest flying roller coaster in the world. Rookburgh and F.L.Y. opened to the public on Thursday, September 17, 2020.

Theme areas

Roller coasters

Water rides

Thrill rides

Dark rides

Other rides

Removed attractions 

Due to its particularly small area Phantasialand is known to remove attractions more frequently than other theme parks to gain space for new attractions.

Performance shows

Silverado Theatre: JUMP!
Arena de Fiesta: Rock on Ice
Wintergarten: Nobis - Der lange Weg vom Ihr zum Wir
Schauspielhaus        Pirates 4D
 Miji African Dancers (does not take place)
China artistry (does not take place)
Wuze Town: Hack and Buddl Children's Show (does not take place)

There are several additional 'mini shows' featured in the new leaflets for 2014, most of them taking place at 'Kaiserplatz', as well as a chance to meet up with the park's dragon characters.

A dinner show called Fantissima is also offered on select evenings, for an additional fee. The show run-time is approximately four hours.

References

External links

 http://phl-infos.de/frontend/ehemaliges/
 Phantasialand website

Amusement parks in Germany
Buildings and structures in Rhein-Erft-Kreis
Tourist attractions in North Rhine-Westphalia
Economy of North Rhine-Westphalia
1967 establishments in Germany